Ormos Panagias is a village on the east coast of Sithonia in Chalkidiki, Greece. Located between Kassandra and Mount Athos, Ormos Panagias is considered by some to be the port of the village of Agios Nikolaos, which is only a few kilometres away.

Villages in Greece